Geevarghese Yulios is the metropolitan bishop of Kunnamkulam Orthodox Diocese. He was born to P V Pavu and K V Anna on May 17, 1967. He is part of the Karimbakuzhi Pulikkottil family from Kunnamkulam. He is the member of St Mathias South Cross Parish.

References

1967 births
Living people
Malankara Orthodox Syrian Church bishops